Richard David Brown (born October 31, 1939) is an American historian specializing in colonial, revolutionary, and early American society and culture. He is a Board of Trustees Distinguished Professor of History Emeritus at the University of Connecticut, where he has taught since 1971.

Early life and education 
Born in New York City to parents Alvyn Adolph and Dorothy Kruskal Brown, Brown attended the Devereux Manor High School in Devon, Pennsylvania, and Fieldston School in New York. He earned a Bachelor of Arts degree from Oberlin College in 1961 and received a Woodrow Wilson Fellowship to attend Harvard University, where he earned an Master of Arts degree in 1962 and a PhD in history in 1966.

Career and service 
Brown began his academic career as a Fulbright lecturer at the University of Toulouse in France in 1965–1966. Returning to Oberlin College, he served as an assistant professor of history from 1967 to 1971. In 1971 he became an associate professor of history at the University of Connecticut, gaining promotion to full professor in 1975 and retiring in 2007. Brown chaired the history department from 1974 to 1980 and directed the University of Connecticut Humanities Institute from 2001 to 2009.

Brown has served as president of the New England Historical Association (1990–1991), a trustee of Old Sturbridge Village (1984–1987), editor-in-chief of the William and Mary Quarterly (1996–1998), and president of the Society for Historians of the Early American Republic (2001–2002). He was a research fellow at Harvard's Charles Warren Center for Studies in American History (1970–1971), a Social Science Research Council faculty fellow (1970–1971), a National Endowment for the Humanities principal investigator for early Massachusetts records (1974–1975), and a Guggenheim Fellow (1998–1999). In 1986, he was a co-recipient of the Charles F. Montgomery Prize awarded by the Decorative Arts Society of the Society of Architectural Historians. He has served as president of The New England Quarterly since 2015.

Personal life 
Brown married historian Irene Quenzler Brown (born April 26, 1938) on June 10, 1962. Like her husband, Irene Brown is a Harvard-educated historian who taught at the University of Connecticut between 1978 and 2003, when she retired. The couple have two sons: Josiah Henry and Nicholas Alvyn.

Published books

References

External links 
Richard D. Brown Papers at the University of Connecticut

1939 births
Living people
Oberlin College alumni
Harvard Graduate School of Arts and Sciences alumni
20th-century American historians
21st-century American historians
20th-century American male writers
21st-century American male writers
Historians of the United States
University of Connecticut faculty
Historians of New England
Historians of the American Revolution
Historians of the Thirteen Colonies